The Time Traveller was one of the earliest science fiction fanzines, started in 1932.  It grew out of a New York City fan club called the Scienceers and was started by Mort Weisinger, Julius Schwartz, Allen Glasser, and Forrest J Ackerman. Initially, Glasser was the "Editor" of the zine, Weisinger "Associate Editor," Schwartz "Managing Editor," and Ackerman "Contributing Editor." (Three of the four editors were 15–17 years old at the time. Allen Glasser was born in 1908.)

According to SF historian Sam Moskowitz, The Time Traveller was the first fanzine to be devoted exclusively to science fiction. It went through a series of incarnations and title switches (Science Fiction Digest; Fantasy Magazine) before it ceased publication in January 1937. The zine's chief claim to fame was its publication of a 17-part round-robin story called Cosmos (July 1933 – December 1934), each part written by a different writer. The roster of Cosmos writers included many of the leading lights of SF, fantasy, horror, and adventure fiction in that era, including A. Merritt, E.E. "Doc" Smith, Edmond Hamilton, John W. Campbell, E. Hoffmann Price, and Otis Adelbert Kline. The others involved were David H. Keller, P. Schuyler Miller, Arthur J. Burks, Ralph Milne Farley, "Eando Binder," Francis Flagg, Lloyd Arthur Eshbach, Bob Olsen, J. Harvey Haggard, and Abner J. Gelula; Raymond A. Palmer wrote one installment under his own name, and another under the pseudonym "Rae Winters." Hamilton composed the final episode of the serial, and finished with a bang, destroying the planets Pluto, Neptune, and Uranus with an atomic disintegrator ray.

References 
Moskowitz, Sam. Seekers of Tomorrow: Masters of Modern Science Fiction. World Publishing, Cleveland, Ohio, 1966. Ballantine Books, New York, 1967; pp. 109–14.
Schwartz, Julius, with Brian M. Thomsen. Man of Two Worlds: My life in Science Fiction and Comics. HarperCollins Publishers, New York, 2000; pp. 10–22.

External links 
The Cosmos Project - Bringing to life the Cosmos sci-fi serial novel

Science fiction fanzines
Hugo Award-winning works
Magazines established in 1932
Magazines disestablished in 1937
Defunct science fiction magazines published in the United States
Magazines published in New York City